Pakistan is a federal republic with three tiers of government: national, provincial and local. Local government is protected by the constitution in Articles 32 and 140-A, and each province also has its own local-government-enabling legislation and ministries responsible for implementation. District councils and metropolitan corporations are respectively the highest rural and urban tiers of local government in the provinces. Both urban and rural local government have two or three tiers in all provinces except Khyber Pakhtunkhwa, where councils are not identified as either urban or rural. There are 129 district councils across the four provinces, 619 urban councils made up of one city district, four metropolitan corporations, 13 municipal corporations, 96 municipal committees, 148 town councils, 360 urban union committees, and 1,925 rural councils. Additionally there are 3339 neighbourhood, ‘tehsil’ and village councils in Khyber Pakhtunkhwa.

Legislation

In response to the failure of central/provincial governments to account for local preferences, the National Reconstruction Bureau (NRB) designed a local government system which was presented in the blue print "Devolution Plan 2000". Consequently, a new local government system was implemented on August 14, 2001, after each of the four provinces passed the Local Government Ordinance, 2001.

Levels

Provinces

The country is composed of four provinces and one federal territory: the provinces of Balochistan, Khyber Pakhtunkhwa, Punjab, Sindh, and the federally-administered Islamabad Capital Territory. Additionally, Pakistan also administers two autonomous territories in the disputed region of Kashmir: Azad Jammu and Kashmir and Gilgit-Baltistan. Due to the ongoing Kashmir dispute with neighbouring India, it also claims sovereignty over the union territories of Jammu and Kashmir and Ladakh, but has not exercised administrative authority over either region since its independence and subsequent war with India in 1947–1948.

Divisions

The four provinces, capital territory and two autonomous territories of Pakistan are subdivided into 37 administrative "divisions". These divisions were abolished in 2000, but restored in 2008. The divisions do not include the Islamabad Capital Territory or the Federally Administered Tribal Areas, which were counted at the same level as provinces, but in 2018 the Federally Administered Tribal Areas were subsumed into Khyber-Paktunkhwa Province and allocated to neighbouring divisions therein.

District

A district (zillah) is the first tier of local government. In total there are 149 districts in Pakistan, of which several are city districts. A District Government or a City District Government and Zillah Council form the governing body, with the District Coordination Officer serving as the administrative head. The District Governor or Zila Nazim used to be the executive head of districts until 2010, when the government shifted power to the District Coordination Officers. Their role is similar to district governors, with responsibility for implementing government strategy and developing initiatives arising out of it.

Tehsil

Among the three tiers of local government, Tehsil government is its second tier. It is where the functions, responsibilities and authorities of districts government is divided into more smaller units, these units are known as "Tehsil". The Tehsils are used in all over the Pakistan except Sindh province where the word "Taluka" is used instead, although the functions and authorities are the same. The head of the Tehsil government is "Tehsil Nazim" who is assisted by the tehsil Naib-Nazim. Every tehsil has a Tehsil Municipal Administration, consisting of a Tehsil council, Tehsil Nazim, tehsil/taluka municipal  officer(TMO), Chief officer and other officials of local council.

Union Council

Members of Union Council including Union Administrator and Vice Union Administrator are elected through direct elections based on adult franchise and on the basis of joint electorate. However, for the election to the reserved seats for Women in Zila Council proportionately divided among Tehsils or Towns shall be all members of the Union Councils in a Tehsil or Town. It is the responsibility of the Chief Election Commissioner to organize and conduct these elections.

Notes

References

External links
 Government of Pakistan: Local Government overview

 
Government of Shaukat Aziz